Fixby is a suburb in north-west Kirklees bordering neighbouring Calderdale and is traditionally part of Huddersfield in the English county of West Yorkshire. Fixby is mentioned in the Domesday Book. The name "Fixby" derives from the Gaelic Irish personal name Fiach.

In the nineteenth century Fixby was a large estate to which social reformer Richard Oastler was appointed as steward from 1830 until 1838 when he was relieved of his duties for his political activities: pamphleteering, lobbying and in the establishment of Short Time Committees in industrial towns throughout Yorkshire. The Short Time committees organised public meetings in order to raise petitions to improve conditions for children in the workplaces of the day and resulted in the Factory Act of 1847, with which Oastler was never fully satisfied.

Much of the historical Fixby Estate is now a golf course based at Fixby Hall, and intersected by the Kirklees Way footpath. Fixby Hall is a grade II listed building.

The area is now sought after suburban location of Huddersfield for homeowners. The village is just off the A6107 road and south of the M62 motorway.

The Huddersfield Crematorium is also situated in the area.

References

Areas of Huddersfield